Thula Ngcobo (born 10 February 1996) is a South African professional cricketer. He made his first-class debut on 16 November 2017, for KwaZulu-Natal in the 2017–18 Sunfoil 3-Day Cup. He made his List A debut on 19 November 2017, for KwaZulu-Natal in the 2017–18 CSA Provincial One-Day Challenge. He made his Twenty20 debut on 14 September 2018, for KwaZulu-Natal in the 2018 Africa T20 Cup. In April 2021, he was named in KwaZulu-Natal Inland's squad, ahead of the 2021–22 cricket season in South Africa.

References

External links
 

1996 births
Living people
South African cricketers
KwaZulu-Natal cricketers
KwaZulu-Natal Inland cricketers
Place of birth missing (living people)